Francis John Mount (14 October 1831 – 9 May 1903) was an Anglican priest.

Mount was educated at Eton and Oriel College, Oxford  and  ordained in 1855. He began his career with a  curacy at St Mark's  Horsham  after which he was an Examining Chaplain to the Bishop of Chichester and Vicar of Firle then Cuckfield. In 1887 he became Archdeacon of Chichester and in 1899 Vicar of Burpham, holding both posts until his death. He was offered the deanery of Chichester Cathedral in late December 1901, but declined due to illness.

Mount's father William, brother William and nephew William were all Members of Parliament.

Notes

1831 births
People educated at Eton College
Alumni of Oriel College, Oxford
Archdeacons of Chichester
1903 deaths
Place of birth missing
Place of death missing